Earthquakes in Papua New Guinea are due to its location near the geologically-active Pacific Ring of Fire. Overall, the population in this region resides in structures that are a mix of vulnerable and earthquake resistant construction. The predominant vulnerable building types are usually metal, timber and unreinforced brick masonry construction.

References

Sources

Papua New Guinea
Earthquakes